Paul N. Enquist (born December 13, 1955 in Seattle, Washington) is an American competition rower and Olympic champion an Olympic Games gold medalist.

Enquist won a gold medal in double sculls at the 1984 Summer Olympics, together with Brad Alan Lewis.

His rowing partner (Lewis) wrote a book about their success at the Olympic contest.

References

1955 births
Living people
American male rowers
Ballard High School (Seattle, Washington) alumni
Olympic gold medalists for the United States in rowing
Rowers from Seattle
Rowers at the 1984 Summer Olympics
Medalists at the 1984 Summer Olympics